Yun Hyon-hi (born 9 September 1992) is a North Korean football forward who played for the North Korea women's national football team at the 2012 Summer Olympics. At the club level, she played for April 25.

International goals

Under-19

See also
 North Korea at the 2012 Summer Olympics

References

External links
 

1992 births
Living people
North Korean women's footballers
Place of birth missing (living people)
Footballers at the 2012 Summer Olympics
Olympic footballers of North Korea
Women's association football forwards
Asian Games medalists in football
Footballers at the 2010 Asian Games
North Korea women's international footballers
Asian Games silver medalists for North Korea
Medalists at the 2010 Asian Games
2011 FIFA Women's World Cup players
2007 FIFA Women's World Cup players
21st-century North Korean women